The Grain of Dust is a lost 1918 American silent romance drama film directed by Harry Revier based on a novel by David Graham Phillips. The film starred Lillian Walker.

Cast
Lillian Walker as Dorothy Hallowell, the Grain of Dust
Ramsey Wallace as Frederick Norman
Ralph Delmore as James Galloway
James O'Neill as William Tetlow
Corinne Uzzell as Ursula Norman
Edith Day as Josephine Burroughs
Richard Wangerman as John Hallowell
Jacques Tyrol as Prince Boris
Cecil Fletcher as New Minister
Elizabeth Ferris as Emily Howe
George Henry
Redfield Clark
Marjorie Vonnegut
Charles Eldridge
Lawrence Evart

References

External links

1918 films
American silent feature films
Lost American films
Films based on American novels
American black-and-white films
American romantic drama films
1918 romantic drama films
1910s American films
Silent romantic drama films
Silent American drama films